Tetragonoderus swahilius is a species of beetle in the family Carabidae. It was described by Alluaud in 1931.

References

Beetles described in 1931
swahilius